Thukkatchi is a village in the Kumbakonam taluk of Thanjavur district, Tamil Nadu, India.

Demographics 

In the 2001 census, Thukkatchi had a total population of 2190 with 1052 males and 1138 females. The sex ratio was 1082. The literacy rate was 73.23

References 

 

Villages in Thanjavur district